Zeljanik is the name of
 a mountain peak in the Klekovača group in the Dinaric Alps in Bosnia and Herzegovina
 a chard-filled, usually savoury pie from the dalmatian Poljica region in Croatia, see Soparnik